Ogroff, also known as Mad Mutilator is a 1983 French slasher film written, directed by, and starring Norbert Moutier (as N. G. Mount) and Howard Vernon. Its plot follows an isolated backwoods lumberjack who attacks and murders people passing through his woods.

Cast
Norbert Moutier as Ogroff
Robert Alaux	
Françoise Deniel	
Pierre Pattin	
Alain Petit as Lumberjack
Howard Vernon as Vampire

Production
The film was shot on Super 8 film in Orléans, France. The film's director, writer, and lead actor, Norbert Moutier (credited as N. G. Mount), was a video rental store proprietor who devised the film with the hopes of renting it to patrons at his store.

Score
In 2018, Jean Richard's complete musical score was released digitally by Specific Recordings on vinyl and digitally via Bandcamp.

Release

Critical response
Joseph A. Ziemba, published in The New York Times, described the film as a "gore-drenched...  European pastiche of American slashers." Promoting a revival screening, the Alamo Drafthouse wrote of the film in a press release: "Director N.G. Mount’s kinetic stylings rip-off any number of early 80s slashers -- and trumps them all. Mount’s madness on all visual, technical, and constitutional levels achieves an iconic trash perfection that is only equalled by fellow idiosyncratic filmmakers Nick Millard, Doris Wishman, and Chester Turner."

Home media
The film had its DVD premiere on December 4, 2012.

See also

Violent Shit
The Corpse Eaters, a horror film created by a theater proprietor for the sole purpose of distribution in that particular venue

References

External links

1983 horror films
1983 films
1980s slasher films
Backwoods slasher films
French slasher films
Films shot in France
French splatter films
French zombie films
Films about cannibalism
Camcorder films
1980s French films